Ed Lee (1952–2017), was mayor of San Francisco.

Ed Lee may also refer to:

Ed Lee (ice hockey) (born 1961), American hockey player
Ed Bok Lee, American poet
Ed Lee (Neighbours), a character on Neighbours

See also
Edward Lee (disambiguation)